Ed Stasium is an American record producer and audio engineer, who has worked on albums by the Ramones, Talking Heads, Motörhead, the Smithereens and Living Colour.

History
Stasium began his recording career in 1970 fronting the band Brandywine. He appeared on their sole LP, Aged. When he returned to the music industry three years later, it was as a recording engineer, working on a wide variety of projects ranging from The Chambers Brothers' Unbonded to Barry Miles' Magic Theater to Sha Na Na's Sha Na Now.  He was the engineer on "Midnight Train to Georgia" by Gladys Knight and the Pips as well as "Dynomite (song)" by Tony Camillo and Bazuka.
 
In 1976 he was again involved as a sound engineer in the production of the album Morin Heights by the Scottish band Pilot, which was recorded in Canada in the studios of the same name. 

Stasium's long affiliation with the American punk and new wave, and the latter-day alternative rock, began in 1977, the year he engineered both the Ramones' Leave Home and Talking Heads' Talking Heads: 77. 

His production career began a year later with the Ramones' Road to Ruin, followed in 1979 by work on the group's It's Alive and the soundtrack to the film Rock 'n' Roll High School.

Stasium enjoyed perhaps his greatest success during the latter half of the 1980s.  In addition to engineering Mick Jagger's Primitive Cool, he scored a major hit with Living Colour's Vivid, and also produced Soul Asylum (Hang Time), the Long Ryders (Two Fisted Tales) and Julian Cope (Saint Julian).

In 1990, he helmed the Smithereens' album, 11, reuniting with the group a year later for Blow Up; Marshall Crenshaw's Life's Too Short and Motörhead's 1916 appeared around the same time. Productions from acts including the Hoodoo Gurus (Crank) and the Reverend Horton Heat (Space Heater) followed as the decade progressed.

In 2006, Stasium produced the rock band, LOURDS. Stasium and Breaking Records founder, Bernadette O'Reilly, were colleagues that reunited for this project. It was produced in Stasium's Durango, Colorado, studio.

In 2014, he produced an album by The Empty Hearts on 429 Records. The band included Blondie drummer Clem Burke, The Chesterfield Kings bassist Andy Babiuk, The Cars guitarist Elliot Easton, The Romantics guitarist and vocalist Wally Palmar, and Small Faces and Faces pianist Ian McLagan. The album was released on August 5, 2014. 

Previously living in Bayfield, Colorado, Stasium currently resides in Poway, California.

Discography

21st Century Rock - T. Roth and Another Pretty Face (1974) (producer)
Dynomite - Bazuka (1975) (engineer)
Morin Heights - Pilot (1976) (engineer)
Talking Heads: 77 - Talking Heads (1977) (engineer)
Leave Home - Ramones (1977) (engineer)
Rocket to Russia - Ramones (1977) (engineer)
Au nord de notre vie - CANO (1977) (engineer)
More Songs About Buildings and Food - Talking Heads (1978) (mixing)
Road to Ruin - Ramones (1978) (producer)
It's Alive - Ramones (1979) (engineer/producer)
Love Goes On - Alda Reserve - Sire - 1979 - Producer/Engineer
Face Facts - T. Roth and Another Pretty Face (1980) (producer)
Love's Melodies - The Searchers (1981)
Demo - Ivy and The Eaters (1983) (producer)
Thank Heaven! Little Girls - Little Girls (1983) (co-producer)
Stukas Over Disneyland - The Dickies (1983)
Parasite (film soundtrack) - "Show A Little Emotion" by Boy (1983)
Scarred (film soundtrack) - "Can't Keep A Bad Boy Down" by Boy (1984)
Lights Out - Peter Wolf (1984) (engineer, guitar, percussion)
Too Tough to Die - Ramones (1984) (producer) 
Translator - Translator (1984)
Evening of the Harvest - Translator (1986)
Evergreen Nights - Lisa Lougheed (1987) (engineer)
Two Fisted Tales - The Long Ryders (1987) (producer)
Vivid - Living Colour (1988) (producer)
Back To The Wall - Crossfire Choir (1988) (producer)
11 - The Smithereens (1989) (producer)
Time's Up - Living Colour (1990) (producer)
Hell to Pay - The Jeff Healey Band (1990) (producer)
1916 - Motörhead (1991) (producer)
Kinky - The Hoodoo Gurus (1992) (mixing)
Mondo Bizarro - Ramones (1992) (producer) 
'92 Tour EP - Motörhead (1992) (producer)
The Downward Road - The Pursuit Of Happiness (1993) (producer) 
Shaved and Dangerous - Baby Animals (1993) (co-producer with Nuno Bettencourt)
State of the World Address - Biohazard (1994)
The Edges of Twilight - The Tea Party (1995) (producer, recorded by, mixing)
A Search for Reason - Kilgore (1998) (producer, mixing)
New World Disorder (album) - Biohazard (1999)
Overbluecity - Skypark (2000) (mixing)
Tinsel Life - Squint (2003)
Far From Nowhere - Slick Shoes (2003)
Knock Yourself Out -  Handsome Devil (2004) (producer)
The Shuteye Train -  Rock and Roll with the Shuteye Train. 2004 (mastering)
Revival - Reverend Horton Heat (2004) (producer)
History Of...- "Whisper of Truth" 2005 (mixing, mastering)
LOURDS - LOURDS 2006 (Producer)
Butterfly Assassins - Sylvia 2008 (mixing)
The Devil's Rain - Misfits (2011) (producer)
 Home - Paceshifters (2012)
Escape Into Life - Tom Ricci (2016) (producer, mixing)
"Walk on Water" - The Verigolds (2017) (producer, mixer)
Famous Monsters - Misfits (producer, mixer, guitar)
Biohazard - Biohazard
Space Heater - Reverend Horton Heat  
Lucky 7 - Reverend Horton Heat  
Biscuits (EP) - Living Colour
Holy Roller - Reverend Horton Heat 
Alhambra - The Tea Party
Under These Rocks and Stones - Chantal Kreviazuk (Hammond organ)
Hang Time - Soul Asylum
My Kind of Christmas 
The Connection - "Gonna Leave You"

References

External links

Ed Stasium Interview - NAMM Oral History Library (2016)

Living people
Year of birth missing (living people)
Record producers from New Jersey
American audio engineers